Jouka Juhola (born 14 July 1997) is a Finnish ice hockey player. He is currently a free agent.

Career
Juhola has played in Ässät since 2017. He has played 132 games there and has 27 points. (regular season)

Career statistics

Regular season and playoffs

References

Living people
1997 births
Finnish ice hockey left wingers
Finnish ice hockey right wingers
Ässät players
People from Harjavalta
Sportspeople from Satakunta
Nybro Vikings players
HK Poprad players
Finnish expatriate ice hockey players in Sweden
Finnish expatriate ice hockey players in Slovakia
Finnish expatriate ice hockey players in Poland